A pentathlon is any sporting competition including five events.

Pentathlon may refer to:

Sports
There are many specific pentathlons consisting of certain sets of events.
 Ancient Olympic pentathlon, an Ancient Greek game comprising long jump, javelin, discus, foot race, and wrestling
 Modern pentathlon, a combined sport for modern Olympic Games
 Athletics pentathlon, a combined sport of five track and field events
 Classic pentathlon, a men's Olympic event from 1906 to 1924
Indoor pentathlon, a combined sport of five track and field events
Paralympic pentathlon, a combined sport for the Paralympic Games
Throws pentathlon, a combined sport of five field throwing events
Women's pentathlon, a combined sport for female athletes, replaced in 1984 by the heptathlon
 Aeronautical pentathlon
 Military pentathlon
 Naval pentathlon
 British Pentathlon, professional darts tournament

Media
 Pentathlon (film), American 1994 film